Spisula subtruncata, the cut through shell, is a medium-sized marine clam, or bivalve mollusc, found in the Eastern Atlantic from Iceland to Morocco and into the Mediterranean Sea. Common and sometimes very numerous.

This species of clam is found in sandy and silty bottom in the sublittoral zone, where it lives as a sediment-burrowing filter feeder.

References

Mactridae
Molluscs of the Atlantic Ocean
Molluscs of the Mediterranean Sea
Bivalves described in 1778